Vilius Baldišis (born 5 January 1961) is a Lithuanian politician.  In 1990 he was among those who signed the Act of the Re-Establishment of the State of Lithuania. He was the chairman of the board of the Bank of Lithuania from 1990 to 1993.

References

External links
 Biography

1961 births
Living people
Lithuanian politicians
Chairmen of the Bank of Lithuania
Signatories of the Act of the Re-Establishment of the State of Lithuania